The French Figure Skating Championships are a figure skating national championship held annually to determine the national champions of France. Medals are awarded in the disciplines of men's singles, ladies' singles, pair skating, and ice dancing. Skaters compete at the senior level. National-level competitions for juniors and novices are held separately.

Senior medalists

Men

Ladies

Pairs

Ice dancing

Junior medalists

Men

Ladies

Pairs

Ice dancing

Advanced novice medalists

Ice dancing

References

Sources
 Du Bief, Raymonde. Le Patinage, "Sport d'Élite". Paris, France: Éditeurs Vigot Frères, 1948.
 "Foreign News", Skating magazine, Mar 1959

External links
 Fédération Français des Sports de Glace 
 Commission Sportive Nationale de Danse sur Glace 
 men's medalists
 ladies' medalists
 pairs medalists
 ice dance medalists

 
Figure skating in France
Figure skating national championships
Figure Skating